Diego Hurtado de Mendoza y Silva, 2nd Marquis of Cañete  (c. 1478–1542) was a Spanish nobleman and military leader.

He was the son of Don Honorato de Mendoza, Lord of the cities of la Parilla and Belmontejo and of Francisca de Silva, daughter of Juan de Silva, 1st Count of Cifuentes. Diego Hurtado de Mendoza inherited the title from his grandfather, Juan Hurtado de Mendoza, 1st Marquis of Cañete, in 1490. He was appointed first captain general and governor of Galicia, and later Viceroy of Navarre in 1534, position he held until his death in 1542.

Additional information

Notes

Sources

1470s births
1542 deaths
Year of birth uncertain
Viceroys of Navarre
Diego 02
Spanish generals
Diego 02
Captain Generals of Galicia